The Rotterdam Pitbulls are a rugby league football club based in Rotterdam, Netherlands. They compete in the Netherlands Rugby League Bond (NRLB) domestic competition called Dutch Rugby League Competition, as well as internationally.

History  
The Rotterdam Pitbulls was started by a group of enthusiastic players, training at local parks throughout Rotterdam. They then formed an official Dutch Rugby Team in December 2014.

The pitbulls won the 2017 NRLB Championship.

2016 Domestic Competition Results Pitbulls

Game 1 April 16th Away 
Amsterdam Cobras 14 - Rotterdam Pitbulls 60

Game 2 April 23rd Home 
Rotterdam Pitbulls 88 - Den Haag Knights 20

Game 3 May 14th Home 
Rotterdam Pitbulls 64 - Amsterdam Cobras 12

Game 4 June 3rd Away 
Den Haag Knights 28 - Rotterdam Pitbulls 34

Game 5 Final June 18th Away 
Rotterdam Pitbulls 42 - Den Haag Knights 16

See also

 Netherlands Rugby League Bond
 Netherlands national rugby league team

References

External links

Rugby league in the Netherlands
Dutch rugby league teams
Rugby clubs established in 2014
2014 establishments in the Netherlands
Sports clubs in Rotterdam
Euro XIII